Bhaskar Oru Rascal is a 2018 Indian Tamil-language action comedy film written and directed by Siddique. A remake of his own Malayalam film Bhaskar the Rascal (2015), the film stars Arvind Swamy, Amala Paul, Master Raghavan, and Baby Nainika, while  Nikesha Patel, Aftab Shivdasani, Soori, and Nassar play supporting roles. The team began production in February 2017. This marks Bollywood actor Aftab Shivdasani's Tamil cinema debut.

Plot  

Bhaskar is a business tycoon and single parent. His father M. A. M. Rangasamy is a retired businessman, and Bhaskar has taken over his textile and real estate businesses. Bhaskar deals with all the complicated and critical situations in his business with rowdyism and is crude and crass. This behavior earns him the name "Rascal". He is a widower and has a son named Aakash. Aakash and Shivani study in the same school. Shivani's mother Anu is also a single parent. She meets Bhaskar at the school, and they get involved in a small altercation. Shivani admires Bhaskar for his authoritative stance and treats him like a father figure for his heroism.

One day, Bhaskar goes with Aakash for a felicitation ceremony, where actress Kalyani is the chief guest. Kalyani gives an interview stating that she is in love with a businessman who is a single parent. Bhaskar reaches the venue at the same time. This creates a confusion among the press and media, and they mistake Bhaskar to be Kalyani's love interest. The reporters bombard him with questions about Kalyani. Bhaskar misinterprets their questions and thinks that they are asking about his favorite beer "Kalyani", and his statements go viral. Kalyani's real love interest happens to see this news and separates from her. Bhaskar tries to set things right by meeting Kalyani's love interest and settling the misunderstanding, but the latter insults Bhaskar. Things take a different course when the person denies Bhaskar an audience and insults him. This leads to Bhaskar thrashing the guy in his office which is also covered by the press.

All these events place Bhaskar in the spotlight for the wrong reasons. Anu does not have a good impression about him but takes a liking to Aakash's mild-mannered nature. In school, Aakash is mocked by his classmates because of his father's recent fiasco. Shivani tries to help Aakash, but one of the boys twists her hand. She attacks the boy in self-defense. The boy's mother makes an issue of it, but thanks to Bhaskar's timely intervention, the matter is sorted out. Bhaskar encourages Shivani to be outspoken and aggressive, but Anu dislikes it. She argues with Bhaskar, takes Shivani home, and scolds her.

Anu tells Shivani the story of how she lost her husband Sanjay long ago in Kolkata because of her aggressive behavior when a few thugs misbehaved towards her in the elevator. She humiliates the thugs for misbehaving with her, but Sanjay does nothing, irritating Anu. Once he drops her off, he drives back to the place and beats up the thugs. Anu follows and sees this and tries to stop Sanjay, but he gets shot by one of the thugs and dies. She states that she does not want the same fate for Shivani and herself.

Meanwhile, Aakash and Shivani plan to get their parents married, so they plan to spend time with their "new parents" - Shivani with Bhaskar and Aakash with Anu. Bhaskar shows interest in Anu, but she remains indifferent and tries to avoid him, even though she tried to understand his good nature.

On Shivani's birthday, a small party is organized. The only guests invited are Aakash and Bhaskar, but a third uninvited guest appears and introduces himself as Sanjay. It is here that Anu reveals that she still has an untold part of what happened to Sanjay on the day he was shot. He was sent to a nearby hospital, but the doctor plans to shift him to another hospital. Anu and her friend follow the ambulance but find that Sanjay was not admitted in the new hospital. He goes missing, and Anu discovers that Sanjay is an assassin and sharpshooter. He had been using her to gain access to a party and had killed her friend's father, who is a scientist and had stolen a research hard disk containing locations of plutonium mines in the country. Anu is shocked because Sanjay not only used her but also seduced her in bed. They ended up having sex, resulting in her getting pregnant. Anu had moved away from Calcutta, gave birth to Shivani, and lived there since then.

Anu accepts Rangasamy's marriage proposal to Bhaskar in order to save herself and Shivani from Sanjay, but she fears putting Bhaskar and Aakash in danger as well and backs out in the last minute. She decides to move to Canada with Shivani permanently. Sanjay's parents intervene and request Anu to go to Kolkata with them one last time to retrieve the hard disk that has been in Anu's locker without her knowledge. They plead that their lives are in danger because of this. Anu goes to Kolkata with Sanjay to retrieve his hard disk along with Bhaskar and the kids. Suddenly, Sanjay's father kidnaps Aakash and Shivani and demands the hard disk from Sanjay, indicating that he has his own plans to make use of it. A fight ensues, and Bhaskar and Anu try to save their kids from Sanjay and his father. Bhaskar ends up saving everyone, and Sanjay and his father are killed. Anu and Shivani cancel their trip to Canada and reunite with Bhaskar and Aakash. Bhaskar and Anu get married. Few months later, Anu gets pregnant with Bhaskar.

Cast

Production 
The success of Siddique's Malayalam film, Bhaskar the Rascal (2015) prompted the makers to consider making a Tamil version, with Ajith Kumar linked to the lead role in late 2015. After the plans failed to materialise, Siddique began discussions with actor Rajinikanth in early 2016 to play the lead role, but the actor eventually chose not to do the film. In September 2016, Siddique finalised Arvind Swamy as the male lead and held unsuccessful discussions with Nayanthara and then Sonakshi Sinha to star opposite him. In early 2017, Siddique selected Amala Paul and Nainika to play the other lead roles in the film. For the role a young male actor, the makers initially approached Aarav, the son of actor Jayam Ravi, and then Aahil, the son of actor Srikanth, to star in the film. The pair's refusal meant that Raghavan, who had previously appeared in Sethupathi (2016) and Pa Paandi (2017), was added to the cast. Siddique revealed that he planned to keep the essence of the original Malayalam film, but would incorporate more action scenes for the Tamil version. Comedy actors including Soori, Ramesh Khanna and Robo Shankar were also drafted in to work on the project. This is movie is the director's fifth in Tamil after Friends (2001), Engal Anna (2004), Sadhu Miranda (2008) and Kaavalan (2011). The shoot of the film began in Kochi during early April 2017. Earlier the release was planned for October 2017, now the plan is to release in March 2018.

Soundtrack 
Soundtrack was composed by Amresh Ganesh and lyrics were written by Pa. Vijay, Karunakaran, Viveka, and Madhan Karky. Soundtrack received positive reviews with a critic calling it "decent work by Amresh".

Release
The film was initially scheduled to be released on January 14 but later got postponed to April 27 however failed to meet the expectations. Despite May 11 being announced as the release date, it was finally released on May 18. The satellite rights of the film were sold to Zee Tamil. The film was also dubbed and released in Hindi as Mawali Raaj on YouTube on 27 December 2019.

Critical reception
Indian Express wrote "The film's setting, story and characters fall flat, reducing Bhaskar Oru Rascal to a very few enjoyable moments that come far in between." The Hindu wrote "It's nice to see Arvind Swami loosen up on screen, but ‘Bhaskar Oru Rascal’ fails to create an emotional connect." Hindustan Times wrote "Barring moments where one can find relief in comedy, Siddique's Bhaskar Oru Rascal falls flat on its face and emerges as one of the most boring films in recent times." Sify called it "average entertainer" falls flat in "comedy and sentiments".

References

External links 
 

2010s Tamil-language films
Films shot in Chennai
Indian action comedy films
Films directed by Siddique
Tamil remakes of Malayalam films
2018 films
Indian family films
2018 action comedy films